This is a list of members of the National Assembly of South Africa, elected in the 2019 general election, for the term 2019–2024.

Current composition

|-style="background:#e9e9e9;"
!colspan="2" style="text-align:left"| Party !! style="text-align:center"| Seats !! %
|-
|  || 230 || 57.5
|-
|  || 84 || 21
|-
|  || 44 || 11
|-
|  || 14 || 3.5
|-
|  || 10 || 2.5
|-
|  || 4 || 1
|-
|  || 2 || 0.5
|-
|  || 2 || 0.5
|-
|  || 2 || 0.5
|-
|  || 2 || 0.5
|-
|  || 2 || 0.5
|-
|  || 2 || 0.5
|-
|  || 1 || 0.25
|-
|  || 1 || 0.25
|-
|colspan="2" style="text-align:left"| Total || style="text-align:right"| 400 || 100.00
|}

Members
Incumbent MPs, including their current party affiliations and the lists from which they were elected, as of 17 March 2023:

Vacancies and replacements
A seat in the National Assembly becomes vacant if the member dies, resigns, ceases to be eligible, ceases to be a member of the party that nominated them, or is elected to the office of President of South Africa. The vacancy is filled from the same party list as the former member.

References
 

Parliament of South Africa
South Africa